Cleisostoma simondii is a flowering plant that grows upon larger trees, and known in Hong Kong as (Chinese:蜘蛛蘭). It also occurs in the Himalayas (Nepal, Bhutan, India, Assam), Cambodia, Laos, Myanmar, Thailand, Vietnam, and other parts of China (Fujian, Guangdong, Hainan, Yunnan).

Etymology
The name "Cleisostoma" derives from the Greek words kleistos, meaning "closed" and "stoma" meaning 
"mouth".

Description

Varieties
Two varieties are recognized:

Cleisostoma simondii var. guangdongense Z.H.Tsi - Fujian, S Guangdong, Hainan
Cleisostoma simondii var. simondii - Yunnan, Himalayas (Nepal, Bhutan, India, Assam), Cambodia, Laos, Myanmar, Thailand, Vietnam

Gallery

References

simondii
Orchids of China
Flora of the Indian subcontinent
Flora of Indo-China
Plants described in 1951